Gaaner Oparey is an Indian Bengali television serial which aired on Star Jalsha from 28 June 2010 to 16 April 2011. This TV musical marked the beginning of a yearlong celebration of the 150th birth anniversary of the great Indian poet Rabindranath Tagore. The concept was a brainchild of the famous Indian director Rituparno Ghosh The songs were all popular Rabindra sangeets. Prosenjit Chatterjee brought back the magic of this show by launching an audio CD of its tracks on Mahalaya on 12 October 2015. On account of Rabindranath Tagore's 157th birthday, Star Jalsha decided to gift audience by uploading Gaaner Oparey on Disney+ Hotstar on 9 May 2018. It was re-aired on Star Jalsha during the 2020 lockdown period, due to the COVID-19 pandemic.

Storyline
The story revolves around a girl named Sohini (more commonly known as Pupe) from an orthodox Tagore worshipping family and Gora, an extremely talented but carefree lad, who repeatedly experiments with Rabindra sangeet. The story traces their relationship and human emotions through an imaginative portrayal of Tagore, his true ideals and their significance today. It also portrays the patriarchal society still prevalent in modern India. The serial used more than fifty Tagore songs and brought out their relevance in the lives of the protagonists. The cast was composed of stalwarts such as Sabyasachi Chakrabarty and Dipankar De plus newcomers Gaurav and Arjun Chakrabarty (sons of Sabyasachi Chakrabarty). The female lead was played by Mimi Chakrabarty in only her second project as an actress.

The show has portrayed three different forms of Rabindrasangeet: the more traditional kind through the voice of Pupe, a fused version with Hindustani classical music, through the voice of Pradipto, and an 'unplugged' rendition, sometimes incorporating rap words and band music, through Gora. Several singers such as Anindya Narayan Biswas, Samantak Sinha, Sharmistha Paul, Soumyojit Das, Amrita Datta, Debashish Banerjee and Runu Dutta were roped for playback singers.

Cast

References 

2010 Indian television series debuts
Star Jalsha original programming
Rabindra Sangeet
2010s romance television series

External links 

 Gaaner Oparey at DIsney+ Hotstar